KCRP-CD (channel 41) is a low-power, Class A television station in Corpus Christi, Texas, United States, affiliated with the Spanish-language UniMás network. It is owned by Entravision Communications alongside Univision affiliate KORO (channel 28). Both stations share studios on North Mesquite Street in Downtown Corpus Christi, while KCRP-CD's transmitter is located on Navigation Boulevard in western Corpus Christi.

History
The station was founded on July 31, 1986 under call sign K22BH, showing music videos. On January 11, 1995, the station joined The WB upon the network's launch; on September 21, 1998, the station dropped WB programming (when cable-only "KWDB" launched) and became an independent station. On May 8, 2000, it changed the call sign to K41FO. On June 14, 2001, it became KCRP-LP and then became KCRP-CA on November 13 that year. In 2002, the station joined TeleFutura; after TeleFutura became UniMás in 2013, the station became an affiliate of the new network. On June 3, 2015, the station was licensed for digital operation and changed the call sign to the current KCRP-CD.

Subchannels
The station's digital signal is multiplexed:

References

External links

UniMás network affiliates
LATV affiliates
CRP-CD
CRP-CD
Television channels and stations established in 1991
Low-power television stations in the United States
Entravision Communications stations
1991 establishments in Texas